The anime television series Vinland Saga is based on the manga series of the same name written and illustrated by Makoto Yukimura. Twin Engine announced in March 2018 that the manga would receive an anime series adaptation, with the first season being produced by Wit Studio. The series is directed by Shūhei Yabuta, with Hiroshi Seko handling series composition, Takahiko Abiru designing the characters and Yutaka Yamada composing the music. The series focuses on Thorfinn, the young Iceland villager who aims to participate in wars like his retired father, Thors.

The first season premiered on July 7, 2019, with the first three episodes airing consecutively, and finished weekly on December 29, of the same year.  The series ran for 24 episodes on NHK General TV. Amazon streamed the first season in North America and Australia on their Prime Video service, while Netflix later secured international streaming rights of the series. Due to the pending arrival of Typhoon Faxai on September 8, 2019, Episode 10 was delayed due to broadcasting news, and resumed on the next week. Due to the airing of the World Para Athletics Championship sports tournament on NHK, Episode 18 was delayed and resumed on November 17, of the same year. 

The season was collected in a total of four Blu-ray volumes released by VAP between December 25, 2019 and March 25, 2020. Sentai Filmworks collected the episodes in a Blu-ray box for the English release. The first opening theme is "MUKANJYO." by Survive Said The Prophet while the first ending theme is "Torches" by Aimer. The second opening theme is "Dark Crow" by Man with a Mission and the second ending theme is "Drown" by milet.


Episode list

Home media release

Japanese

English

Notes

References

External links
  
  
 

Vinland Saga